A virtual number, also known as direct inward dialing (DID) or access numbers, is a telephone number without a directly associated telephone line. Usually, these numbers are programmed to forward incoming calls to one of the pre-set telephone numbers, chosen by the client: fixed, mobile or VoIP. A virtual number can work like a gateway between traditional calls (PSTN) and VoIP.

Subscribers to virtual numbers may use their existing phones, without the need to purchase additional hardware, i.e. use the numerous available software.

A virtual private number is a telephone number that forwards incoming calls to any of a number of pre-set telephone numbers. These are also called a follow-me number,  a virtual telephone number or (in the UK) Personal Number.

Usually a virtual telephone number can be set to forward calls to different telephone numbers depending on the time of day and the day of the week using time of day routing; for example, between 9 and 5 on working days incoming calls will be forwarded to one's workplace, but in the weekends to one's cellphone.

The availability (and acceptable use) of virtual phone numbers are subject to the regulatory situation in the issuing country.

Applications and example of use 
 Businesses – a company located in China can have a phone number in Los Angeles or London without paying for a fixed foreign exchange line. Virtual numbers are very popular among call centers which appear to be located in one country, when they are in one or more countries in different time zone, delivering efficient 24/7 cover.
As the world of business is starting to move away from offices and fixed office environments, virtual numbers fill the gap. The growing trends are for small businesses, startups or even businesses set up with multi homeworkers now using virtual numbers to manage their inbound and outbound calling.

For example:
Joe the plumber might want a London Virtual Numbers which diverts inbound calls to his mobile. Alternatively you might have 20 office workers having to now work from home due to covid lock down and need to have their main office landline number as a virtual number routing calls to multiple destinations—mobiles, softphones or home office deskphones.
 Individuals – other popular users of international virtual numbers are migrants and travelers, who appreciate that their friends and family back home can contact them using a local call.
 Specific businesses – calling cards or callback. Virtual numbers work like access numbers, e.g., the phone number that (calling cards) or callback's user has to dial to make the call/(use callback).
 Marketing – some companies use virtual numbers for various marketing campaigns, or different media channels; this allows them to track which campaign or medium brings what kind of traffic.
 Virtual services – various providers of virtual business services (virtual address, virtual receptionist, virtual office) will use a virtual number to tie in their other virtual services together. This allows their customers to have a phone, address and voice presence almost anywhere in the world.
 Disposable numbers are phone numbers that are used for a limited time. In San Antonio fake businesses used disposable numbers printed on pizza fliers to deliver inferior quality pizzas.

Most voice over IP providers offer virtual numbers; unbundled providers label these as "DIDs" (direct inward dial). These are typically offered as local geographic numbers in various selected cities or as toll-free numbers, with the non-geographic number carrying higher per-minute cost to receive calls.

In the North American Numbering Plan, Area code 500 and Area code 533 are follow-me numbers, and referred to as Personal Communications Service (NANP).

In the United Kingdom, these are over 600 area code or local exchange codes 01 & 02 numbers which can be set up as virtual numbers as well as the 0800 & 0345.

See also
 Follow-me, the same concept for PBXs
 Unified Messaging
 Universal Personal Telecommunications

References 

Telephone numbers